Alexander Tkachev may refer to:

 Alexander Tkachov (politician) (born 1960), governor of Krasnodar Krai, Russia
 Aleksandr Tkachyov (gymnast) (born 1957), Soviet/Russian gymnast
 Alexander Tkachev (swimmer) (born 1972), Russian-born Kyrgyz swimmer